Alexander Shaw, 2nd Baron Craigmyle (28 February 1883 – 29 September 1944) was a Scottish Liberal Party politician.

Life
Shaw was a lawyer by profession, having studied at Trinity College, Oxford (where he was President of the Oxford Union in 1905) and being called to the bar in 1908. 

In 1913, he married Lady Margaret Cargill Mackay, who gave him one son and three daughters. During the First World War he served in the Royal Marine Artillery and was involved in the Battle of the Somme. Outside Parliament, he was a director of the Bank of England and Chairman of P & O.

The son of the Law Lord Thomas Shaw, 1st Baron Craigmyle, he succeeded to the peerage on his father's death in 1937.

Upon his own death in 1944, aged 61, he was succeeded by his only son Thomas Donald Mackay Shaw (1923–1998).

Parliamentary career
He was elected unopposed as the member of parliament (MP) for the Kilmarnock Burghs at a by-election in 1915, and held the seat until its abolition for the 1918 general election. He was then elected as a Coalition Liberal for the new county constituency of Kilmarnock, retaining the seat as a Liberal in 1922. He resigned from the House of Commons on 12 November 1923 by the procedural device of accepting a nominal appointment as Steward of the Chiltern Hundreds. no by-election was held, and the seat remained vacant when Parliament was dissolved on 16 November for the 1923 general election.

Arms

References

External links
Thomas Donald Mackay Shaw, 3rd Baron Craigmyle obituary, independent.co.uk. Accessed 12 December 2022.

1883 births
1944 deaths
Shaw, Alexander
Alumni of Trinity College, Oxford
Shaw, Alexander
Barons in the Peerage of the United Kingdom
British Army personnel of World War I
Shaw, Alexander
Shaw, Alexander
Shaw, Alexander
Shaw, Alexander
UK MPs who inherited peerages
Shaw, Alexander
Sons of life peers